The 2012 FIM Motocross World Championship was the 56th F.I.M. Motocross World Championship season. It included 30 races at 15 events including The Netherlands, Bulgaria, Italy, Mexico, Brazil, France, Portugal, Belgium, Sweden, Latvia, Russia, Czech Republic, Great Britain and Germany.

2012 Calendar
The 2012 calendars of the FIM Motocross World Championships promoted by Youthstream were finalised on 7 July 2011.

Riders' Championship

MX1 
Points are awarded to the top 20 classified finishers.

(key)

MX2

MX3

Manufacturers' Championship

MX1

MX2

MX3

Participants
 Riders with red background numbers are defending champions. All riders were announced with numbers on February 7, 2012.

MX1 participants

MX2 participants

References

External links
 

Motocross
Motocross World Championship seasons